Georgia Lind (1905–1984) was a German stage and film actress. She appeared in a mixture of leading and supporting roles in films. From the mid-1930s she devoted herself increasingly to the theatre, and post-Second World War she also did a large amount of radio work. One of her final film performances was a small role in Robert A. Stemmle's Berliner Ballade (1948). She was married to the actor Rudolf Platte.

Filmography
 Yes, Yes, Women Are My Weakness (1929)
 Left of the Isar, Right of the Spree (1929)
 The Youths (1929)
 Distinguishing Features (1929)
 They May Not Marry (1929)
 Painted Youth (1929)
 The Right to Love (1930)
 The Love Market (1930)
 Rag Ball (1930)
 Delicatessen (1930)
 How Do I Become Rich and Happy? (1930)
  (1932)
 How Shall I Tell My Husband? (1932)
 A Woman Like You (1933)
 Höllentempo (1933)
 The Sandwich Girl (1933)
 The Two Seals (1934)
 Shipwrecked Max (1936)
 The Man Who Couldn't Say No (1938)
 Berliner Ballade (1948)
  (1958)

References

Bibliography

External links

1905 births
1984 deaths
German stage actresses
German film actresses
People from Chemnitz
German radio actresses
20th-century German actresses